Herb Granath (1928 - November 2019) was an American sportscaster. In 2001, he was awarded the Sports Emmy for Sports Lifetime Achievement Award. Granath spent the bulk of his career with ABC, spearheading their movements into cable and international television. He also served as Chairman of the Board for ESPN, A&E, The History Channel, Lifetime Television and Disney/ABC International. He also served as president of Capital Cities/ABC's Video Enterprises. Following his time with ABC, he served as co-chairman of Crown Media Holdings, vice chairman of Central European Media, and senior content adviser to Telenet. Granath was a graduate of Fordham University and spent time in the military at the beginning of his career. Granath's wife of over sixty years was Ann Flood.

Granath lived in Darien, Connecticut, and died in November 2019.

References

1928 births
2019 deaths
Sports Emmy Award winners
American Broadcasting Company executives
ESPN people
Fordham University alumni